Poul B. Jensen is a Danish astronomer and a discoverer of 98 minor planets while working at Brorfelde Observatory. Between 1967 and 1969 he assisted in positional observations with the observatory's 7" transit circle. He is also a co-discoverer (with Carolyn S. Shoemaker) of the Comet Jensen-Shoemaker (1987g1). , he was still publishing in the Minor Planet Circulars.

On 22 July 1994, the main-belt asteroid 5900 Jensen was named by his colleges Karl Augustesen and Hans Jørn Fogh Olsen in his and his wife's honor.

List of discovered minor planets

See also 
 List of minor planet discoverers

References 
 

20th-century Danish astronomers
Discoverers of asteroids
Living people
Year of birth missing (living people)